Jack Kelly (born 26 October 1997) is an Irish rugby union player, who plays for the Ireland national rugby sevens team.

Early life
Kelly was born in Dublin. He lived for two years in France during his childhood, also playing rugby, and speaks fluent French. Kelly attended secondary school at St. Michael's College in Dublin. Despite playing in several strong school teams with fellow future professional rugby players such as Dan Leavy, James Ryan and others, he did not win a Leinster Schools Rugby Senior Cup medal.

Leinster
Kelly joined the Leinster academy immediately upon leaving school in 2016. He made his senior Leinster debut in 2018 against Ospreys. He combines his rugby career with studying law in Trinity College, Dublin.

National team
Kelly was selected to captain the Ireland national under-20 rugby union team for the 2017 Six Nations, becoming the sixth consecutive Ireland under 20s captain to have attended St. Michael's College. Ireland had a mixed campaign, finishing fourth, before enduring a poor Junior World Championship in June 2017, finishing tenth of twelve teams.

Kelly also plays for the Ireland national rugby sevens team. He debuted for the team at the 2019 London Sevens, and also played in a 2019 European qualifying tournament for the 2020 Summer Olympics. Kelly had a breakout season during the 2019–20 World Rugby Sevens Series, Ireland's first season as a core team on the Series, where Kelly led all Irish forwards with nine clean breaks and eight tries.

Kelly was a member of the Ireland national rugby sevens team that qualified for the 2020 Summer Olympics. He also competed for Ireland at the 2022 Rugby World Cup Sevens in Cape Town.

References

External links
Pro14 Profile
Leinster Academy Profile

Living people
1997 births
People educated at St Michael's College, Dublin
Rugby union players from Dublin (city)
Irish rugby union players
Dublin University Football Club players
Leinster Rugby players
Olympic rugby sevens players of Ireland
Rugby sevens players at the 2020 Summer Olympics
Irish expatriates in France